István Somodi (22 August 1885, Kolozsvár, Kingdom of Hungary – 8 June 1963, Cluj, Romania) was a Hungarian athlete who competed mainly in the high jump.

He competed for Hungary at the 1908 Summer Olympics, held in London, Great Britain, where he won the silver medal in the high jump.

References

1885 births
1963 deaths
Sportspeople from Cluj-Napoca
Hungarian male high jumpers
Olympic silver medalists for Hungary
Athletes (track and field) at the 1908 Summer Olympics
Olympic athletes of Hungary
Medalists at the 1908 Summer Olympics
Olympic silver medalists in athletics (track and field)
Olympic male high jumpers